Martin Metzger (18 November 1925 – 17 June 1994) was a Swiss racing cyclist. He rode in the 1950 Tour de France.

References

External links
 

1925 births
1994 deaths
Swiss male cyclists
Place of birth missing
Tour de Suisse stage winners